The 1996 New Zealand rugby union tour of South Africa was a historic tour in the history of New Zealand rugby. The All Blacks won the test series 2–1 and became known as "the Incomparables" for their feat of winning a series in South Africa for the first time.

The Rivalry
The Springboks and the All Blacks have been typically regarded by many as the two greatest rugby playing nations of all time. New Zealand and South Africa had clashed in many tours over time which had been hotly contested. This included the controversial 1981 tour. The All Blacks had never beaten South Africa in a full-scale test series in South Africa. This was seen as the only blemish on the All Blacks record. All Black sides of 1928, 1949, 1960, 1970 and 1976 had all failed to beat South Africa away from home. The rivalry has always been hotly contested. 1996 was the year professionalism was introduced into rugby union meaning the creation of the new Tri nations and Super 12. As of 2021 no further full-scale tours have occurred between New Zealand and South Africa.

More recently the All Blacks had clashed with South Africa in the 1995 Rugby World Cup Final. The All Blacks lost that match but coming into this tour they had won the 1996 Tri Nations Series in the process beating South Africa twice.

The Tour
The All Blacks and South Africa played four test matches; the first was the final match of the 1996 Tri Nations Series. The next three was for the test series which the All Blacks won 2–1.

1st Test

2nd Test

3rd Test

Matches
Scores and results list New Zealand's points tally first.

The squad
1. S.D. Culhane
2. J.P. Preston
3. M.J. A. Cooper
4. J.W. Wilson
5. Z.V. Brooke
6. S.J. McLeod
7. O.F. J. Tonu'u
8. A.P. Mehrtens
9. A.F. Blowers
10. C.M. Cullen
11. S.B. T. Fitzpatrick
12. A. Ieremia
13. B.P. Larsen
14. W.K. Little
15. J.T. Lomu
16. J.W. Marshall
17. G.M. Osborne
18. E.J. Rush
19. C.J. Spencer
20. M.R. Allen
21. C.K. Barrell
22. T.J. Blackadder
23. R.M. Brooke
24. O.M. Brown
25. F.E. Bunce
26. P.H. Coffin
27. C.S. Davis
28. C.W. Dowd
29. N.J. Hewitt
30. I.D. Jones
31. M.N. Jones	
32. J.A. Kronfeld
33. J.T. F. Matson
34. A.D. Oliver
35. T.C. Randell
36. G.L. Taylor

See also
 History of rugby union matches between New Zealand and South Africa

References

New Zealand
New Zealand national rugby union team tours of South Africa
South Africa